Donald Stewart Ethell  (born July 23, 1937) is a retired Canadian Army colonel and was the 17th Lieutenant Governor of Alberta from 2010 to 2015.

Career
Ethell was born in Vancouver, British Columbia, in 1937, the son of a nurse and a navy chief petty officer. He enlisted in the Canadian Army in 1955 after being rejected by the Navy and rejected from the Air Force.

Ethell enlisted as a rifleman in the Queen's Own Rifles of Canada at the age of 17 and underwent basic training at the Currie Barracks in Calgary. He served in West Germany during the Cold War and rebadged to Princess Patricia's Canadian Light Infantry in 1970 when the Queen's Own Rifles of Canada was removed from regular army service. He rose through the non-commissioned officer ranks to warrant officer until he was  commissioned as an officer in 1972.

Demonstrating an ability for leadership, Ethell steadily rose to the rank of colonel. He successively became a veteran of 14 international peacekeeping deployments, with service in Cyprus, Lebanon, Syria, Jordan, Egypt, Israel, Central America and the Balkans. Following his military retirement in 1993, Ethell became involved in humanitarian efforts, including CARE Canada.

He is an officer in the Order of Canada and the Order of Military Merit and a member of the Alberta Order of Excellence.

Lieutenant governor
On April 8, 2010, Prime Minister Stephen Harper announced his appointment as the next Lieutenant Governor of Alberta. He was installed on May 11, 2010. He was made a Knight of Justice in the Venerable Order of Saint John on September 11, 2010, and installed as vice prior of the order's Alberta Council.

As the viceregal representative in Alberta, he was styled "His Honour" while in office and has the right to the style "the Honourable" for life.  He succeeded Norman Kwong.

During his time as Lieutenant Governor, Ethell has sworn in each of Alison Redford, Dave Hancock, and Jim Prentice as Premier of Alberta.  Rachel Notley was sworn in on his behalf by Catherine Fraser, the Chief Justice of Alberta, as Ethell was recovering from back surgery.

Arms

References

External links

 Ethell's Alberta Order of Excellence citation

1937 births
Lieutenant Governors of Alberta
Members of the Alberta Order of Excellence
Officers of the Order of Canada
Recipients of the Meritorious Service Decoration
Living people
People from Vancouver
Queen's Own Rifles of Canada soldiers
Princess Patricia's Canadian Light Infantry officers
Canadian Army officers
21st-century Canadian politicians
Officers of the Order of Military Merit (Canada)